Plas Point (‘Nos Plas’ \'nos 'plas\) is the point on the south side of the entrance to Nevsha Cove, Graham Coast on the Antarctic Peninsula.  Its shape was enhanced as a result of the adjacent Funk Glacier and Cadman Glacier retreating during the last decade of 20th century and the first decade of 21st century.

The feature is named after Plas Peak in Pirin Mountain, Bulgaria.

Location

Maps
 Antarctic Digital Database (ADD). Scale 1:250000 topographic map of Antarctica. Scientific Committee on Antarctic Research (SCAR). Since 1993, regularly upgraded and updated.

References
 Plas Point. SCAR Composite Antarctic Gazetteer.
 Bulgarian Antarctic Gazetteer. Antarctic Place-names Commission. (details in Bulgarian, basic data in English)

External links
 Plas Point. Copernix satellite image

Bulgaria and the Antarctic
Headlands of Graham Land
Graham Coast